The Illinois Department of Commerce and Economic Opportunity (DCEO) is the code department of the Illinois state government that sponsors statewide economic development, with special emphases on increasing minority entrepreneurship, promoting the tourism industry, and recruiting Illinois as a location for business investment and film production.

See also 
 Tourism in Chicago

References

External links
 Illinois Department of Commerce and Economic Opportunity

Commerce and Economic Opportunity
State departments of commerce of the United States